Dieter Winter (born 17 April 1954) is a retired German football midfielder.

References

1954 births
Living people
German footballers
VfL Wolfsburg players
Association football midfielders
2. Bundesliga players
VfL Wolfsburg managers
West German footballers
Footballers from Berlin
West German football managers